The borate chlorides are chemical compounds that contain both borate ions and chloride ions. They are mixed anion compounds. Many of them are minerals. Those minerals that crystallise with water (hydrates) may be found in evaporite deposits formed when mineral water has dried out.

List

References